The Dutch cricket team toured Canada during the 2007 season. Two One Day Internationals were played, preceded by a First-class match, which was a part of the 2007-08 ICC Intercontinental Cup. The Dutch team won the First-class match by 45 runs, and won the ODI series 1-0: winning the first match by 117 runs, with the second being rained off.

Squad lists

The Netherlands elected for the same squad for both the ODI and First-class matches.

Intercontinental Cup match

Shahzad Khan, Mudassar Bukhari, Atse Buurman and Mangesh Panchal made their First-class debuts in this match. Peter Borren and Alexei Kervezee recorded career best First-class high scores.

ODI series

1st ODI

Trevin Bastiampillai, Mohsin Mulla, Shahzad Khan, Mudassar Bukhari and Atse Buurman made their ODI debuts in this match. Peter Borren's score of 96 is his highest in ODI and List A cricket, whilst Edgar Schiferli recorded career best ODI figures of 3/18.

2nd ODI

References

External links
CricketArchive - Tour homepage 
Cricinfo - Tour homepage

2007 in cricket
2007 in Canadian sports